The 2021 Atlantic 10 Conference women's soccer tournament was the postseason women's soccer tournament for the Atlantic 10 Conference held from October 30 through November 7, 2021. The quarterfinals of the tournament were held at campus sites, while the semifinals and final took place at Baujan Field in Dayton, Ohio. The eight-team single-elimination tournament consisted of three rounds based on seeding from regular season conference play. The defending tournament champions were the Saint Louis Billikens, who successfully defended their championship as the third seed, defeating fourth seed UMass in the final.  This was the Billikens' sixth overall tournament title, and coach Katie Shields' fourth title.  Shields and Saint Louis have won four straight Atlantic 10 Tournaments in a row. As tournament champions, Saint Louis earned the Atlantic 10's automatic berth into the 2021 NCAA Division I Women's Soccer Tournament.

Bracket

Source:

Schedule

Quarterfinals

Semifinals

Final

Statistics

Goalscorers

All Tournament Team 

Source:

MVP in bold

References 

 
Atlantic 10 Conference Women's Soccer Tournament